Qatar Sports Club is a sports club based in Doha, Qatar. It is best known for its football team which competes in the Qatar Stars League. The club was founded in 1961 as a merger of two Qatari football clubs Al-Oruba and Al-Nasour.

They play their home games in the Qatar SC Stadium, which has a capacity of 15,000 It has recently diversified into sports other than football. An athletics group has been established, and this department competes in javelin throwing, long jumps, and sprinting. The club adopted its current name, Qatar SC, in 1981.

History

Formation (1972)
In 1972, Al-Oruba merged with Al-Nasour to forma new football club named Al-Esteqlal. Former player Saad Mohammed Saleh was selected as the first coach. Al Esteqlal was one of the strongest clubs since its establishment, winning its first official Q-League season in 1972–73. The next year, in 1974, Al Sadd hired head coach Hassan Othman from the club in addition to 14 of its players, including Hassan Mattar and Mubarak Anber, much to the dismay of club president Hamad bin Suhaim. During this period, transfers could be made unconditionally in Qatari football. Despite the resounding difficulties arising from the transfer fiasco, it continued with its success, winning the 1976–77 season and supplying the national team with some of its most prominent players.

1981–present: Qatar SC
Al Esteqlal was renamed Qatar SC in 1981. However, it gradually faded into obscurity for the next 2 decades, with the league being dominated by Al Arabi, Al Sadd, and Al Rayyan. The club won the Qatar Crown Prince Cup in 2002 and also won the 2002–03 league season by three points. They won the Crown Prince Cup the same year, and again in 2009. The club was relegated to Qatari Second Division after the 2015-16 season, but were promoted back to the top division the next season.

Name history
 1972: The club was founded by a merger of Al-Oruba and Al Nasour, and was named Al Esteqlal
 1981: The club was renamed Qatar Sports Club

Stadium
Qatar SC play their matches at Suheim bin Hamad Stadium, which is located in Al Dafna. It is a multi-purpose stadium, featuring an athletics field, a gym, a shopping centre and a mosque, among other facilities. The stadium has a capacity of 15,000 seats. Besides local football matches, the stadium also hosts a number of tournaments such as Qatar Athletic Super Grand Prix and some of the 2011 AFC Asian Cup matches.

Players
As of Qatar Stars League:

Out on loan

Achievements

Qatar Stars League
 Champions (3): 1972–73, 1976–77, 2002–03

Qatari Second Division
 Champions: 2016–17

Emir of Qatar Cup
 Champions (2): 1973–74, 1975–76

Qatar Crown Prince Cup
 Champions (3): 2002, 2004, 2009

Qatar Sheikh Jassem Cup
 Champions (4): 1983, 1984, 1987, 1995

Qatari Stars Cup/QNB Cup
 Champions: 2014

Records and statistics
Last update: 15 March 2023.
 Players whose names are in bold are still active with the club.''

Recent seasons
{|class="wikitable"
|-bgcolor="#efefef"
!Season
!Division
!Pos.
!Pl.
!W
!D
!L
!GS
!GA
!P
!Emir Cup
|-
|1996–97
|1D
|align=right|7
|align=right|16||align=right|4||align=right|3||align=right|9
|align=right|19||align=right|19||align=right|15
||Round 1
|-
|1997–98
|1D
|align=right |6
|align=right|16||align=right|5||align=right|4||align=right|7
|align=right|17||align=right|22||align=right|19
||Round 1
|-
|1998–99
|1D
|align=right |6
|align=right|16||align=right|5||align=right|2||align=right|9
|align=right|16||align=right|27||align=right|17
||Round 1
|-
|1999–2000
|1D
|align=right |7
|align=right|16||align=right|4||align=right|6||align=right|6
|align=right|14||align=right|24||align=right|18
||Quarter-finals
|-
|2000–01
|1D
|align=right |8
|align=right|16||align=right|4||align=right|2||align=right|10
|align=right|18||align=right|27||align=right|14
||Round 2
|-
|2001–02
|1D
|align=right bgcolor=silver |2
|align=right|16||align=right|9||align=right|2||align=right|5
|align=right|30||align=right|17||align=right|29
||Semifinals
|-
|2002–03
|1D
|align=right bgcolor=gold |1
|align=right|18||align=right|10||align=right|5||align=right|3
|align=right|24||align=right|10||align=right|34
||Semifinals
|-
|2003–04
|1D
|align=right bgcolor=silver |2
|align=right|18||align=right|10||align=right|4||align=right|4
|align=right|31||align=right|17||align=right|34
|bgcolor=silver|Runners-up
|-
|2004–05
|1D
|align=right |4
|align=right|27||align=right|14||align=right|3||align=right|10
|align=right|40||align=right|34||align=right|45
||Quarter-finals
|-
|2005–06
|1D
|align=right bgcolor=silver |2
|align=right|27||align=right|14||align=right|7||align=right|6
|align=right|49||align=right|34||align=right|49
||Semifinals
|-
|2006–07
|1D
|align=right|6
|align=right|27||align=right|10||align=right|4||align=right|13
|align=right|35||align=right|36||align=right|34
||Quarter-finals
|-
|2007–08
|1D
|align=right |4
|align=right|27||align=right|14||align=right|4||align=right|9
|align=right|53||align=right|38||align=right|46
||Semifinals
|-
|2008–09
|1D
|align=right |4
|align=right|27||align=right|11||align=right|10||align=right|6
|align=right|42||align=right|36||align=right|43
||Semifinals
|-
|2009–10
|1D
|align=right |4
|align=right|22||align=right|11||align=right|5||align=right|6
|align=right|32||align=right|23||align=right|38
||Semifinals
|-
|2010–11
|1D
|align=right|5
|align=right|22||align=right|11||align=right|7||align=right|4
|align=right|40||align=right|26||align=right|40
|Quarter-finals
|-
|2011–12
|1D
|align=right|10
|align=right|22||align=right|6||align=right|6||align=right|10
|align=right|32||align=right|46||align=right|24
|Round 3
|}

Technical staff

Senior team

Youth team

Managerial history

Performance in AFC competitions
 AFC Champions League: 1 appearance
2003–04: Group Stage

References

External links

Basketball team
Official website

 
Football clubs in Qatar
Football clubs in Doha
Association football clubs established in 1961
Multi-sport clubs in Qatar
1961 establishments in Qatar